The 2008 European Seniors Tour was the 17th season of the European Seniors Tour, the professional golf tour for men aged fifty and above operated by the PGA European Tour. Welshman Ian Woosnam won two events and his first Order of Merit title.

Tournament results
The numbers in brackets after the winners' names show the number of career wins they had on the European Seniors Tour up to and including that event. This is only shown for players who are members of the tour.

For the tour schedule on the European Seniors Tour's website, including links to full results, click here.

Leading money winners

There is a complete list on the official site here.

External links

European Seniors Tour
European Senior Tour